Chipata District is a district of Zambia, located in Eastern Province. The capital lies at Chipata. As of the 2010 Zambian Census, the district had a population of 455,783  people.

Chipata City Centre is located about 600 km from Lusaka, the capital city of Zambia, on the Great East Road while it is only 110 km from Lilongwe, the capital city of Malawi. Thus, Chipata accesses its imports mainly from Nacala and Dar es Salaam ports in Mozambique and Tanzania respectively, all routes passing through Malawi to Mwami Border.  The District has a firm foundation of being a trade centre dating back to the colonial era of the current Zambia, when it was called Fort Jameson and was the capital of North-Eastern Rhodesia up to 1911. This cornerstone has left the town as the hub of Eastern Province, by maintaining its position as a Provincial Headquarters. Chipata was declared a city on 24 February 2017 (no-longer a town).

Constituencies 
Chipata District has two constituencies, namely Chipata Central and Luangeni.

References

 
Districts of Eastern Province, Zambia